This is a list of notable cemeteries in Tennessee.
Entries marked ‡ are cemeteries with notable monuments or burials.

East Tennessee 
‡ Andrew Johnson National Cemetery, Greeneville
‡ Chattanooga National Cemetery, Chattanooga
 Bethesda Presbyterian Church Cemetery, Russellville
 Delap Cemetery, Campbell County
  East Hill Cemetery, Bristol
 First Presbyterian Church Cemetery, Knoxville
 Kelly's Ferry Cemetery, Marion County
 Knoxville National Cemetery, Knoxville
 Lebanon in the Forks Cemetery, Knoxville
 Mountain Home National Cemetery, Johnson City
 Old Gray Cemetery, Knoxville
 Wheat Community African Burial Ground, Oak Ridge

Middle Tennessee 
 Cedar Grove Cemetery, Lebanon
 Confederate Cemetery Monument, Farmington
 Evergreen Cemetery, Murfreesboro
‡ Forest Lawn Memorial Gardens, Goodlettsville
  Fort Donelson National Cemetery, Dover
 Greenwood Cemetery, Nashville
 Hendersonville Memory Gardens, Hendersonville
 McGavock Confederate Cemetery, Franklin
 Maplewood Cemetery, Pulaski
‡ Mount Olivet Cemetery, Nashville
 Nashville City Cemetery
 Nashville National Cemetery, Madison 
 Old Cathey Cemetery, Maury County
 Rest Haven Cemetery, Franklin
 Rest Hill Cemetery, Lebanon
 St Mary's Cemetery, Lawrence County
‡ Spring Hill Cemetery, Nashville
 Stones River National Cemetery, Murfreesboro
 Temple Cemetery, Nashville
 Toussaint L'Ouverture County Cemetery, Franklin
‡ Woodlawn Memorial Park Cemetery, Nashville

West Tennessee 
‡ Elmwood Cemetery, Memphis
 Forest Hill Cemetery, Memphis
‡ Graceland, Memphis
‡ Hollywood Cemetery,  Jackson
‡ Memorial Park Cemetery, Memphis
 Memphis National Cemetery, Memphis
 Oakland Cemetery, Trenton
 Pleasant Hill Cemetery, Finley
 Riverside Cemetery,  Jackson
 Shiloh National Cemetery
 Woodlawn Baptist Church and Cemetery, Nutbush

See also
 List of cemeteries in the United States

References

Cemeteries in Tennessee
Tennessee